The prime minister of the West Indies Federation was the head of government of the short lived West Indies Federation (also known as the British Caribbean Federation), which consisted of ten provinces: Antigua (with Barbuda), Barbados, Dominica, Grenada, Jamaica (with the Cayman Islands and the Turks & Caicos Islands), Montserrat, St. Christopher-Nevis-Anguilla, St. Lucia, St. Vincent, and Trinidad and Tobago. The federation was formed on 3 January 1958, and was formally dissolved on 31 May 1962.

The prime minister was elected by the House of Representatives from among its members, constitutionally acted as an advisor to the governor-general of the West Indies Federation, and was involved in economic planning, but had very little power beyond those roles, being junior to the position of governor-general.

Starting in January 1959, the governor-general, Lord Hailes, attempted to get Adams to step down so he could be replaced with Norman Manley, whom Hailes saw as endorsing "decentralised federation" and being able to bring "most responsible people in Jamaica" with him.

Prime Minister of the West Indies Federation (1958–1962)
Parties

See also 
 Prime Minister of the Netherlands Antilles (Dutch West Indies)
 1961 Jamaican Federation of the West Indies membership referendum

References

External links
World Statesmen – West Indies Federation

West Indies Federation, Prime Minister
West Indies Federation, Prime Minister
Westminster system
West Indies Federation
Titles held only by one person